Mishkinsky (masculine), Mishkinskaya (feminine), or Mishkinskoye (neuter) is the name of several rural localities in Russia:
Mishkinsky (rural locality), a settlement in Muravlsky Selsoviet of Trosnyansky District of Oryol Oblast
Mishkinskaya, a stanitsa in Mishkinskoye Rural Settlement of Aksaysky District of Rostov Oblast